Pustoi Island (Taĝilgadax in Aleut) is an island in the Fox Islands group of the eastern Aleutian Islands, Alaska.  It is 0.3 miles across and is located in Umnak Pass 2 mi north of Ship Rock off the northeast coast of Umnak Island.  The name is derived from the Russian "Ostrov Pustoy," meaning "desert island," a name given to it by navigator Peter Kuzmich Krenitzin and published by Captain Tebenkov in 1852.

References

Islands of Aleutians West Census Area, Alaska
Fox Islands (Alaska)
Islands of Alaska
Islands of Unorganized Borough, Alaska